Lee Goldberg is an American author, screenwriter, publisher and producer known for his bestselling novels Lost Hills and True Fiction and his work on a wide variety of TV crime series, including Diagnosis: Murder, A Nero Wolfe Mystery, Hunter, Spenser: For Hire, Martial Law, She-Wolf of London, SeaQuest, 1-800-Missing, The Glades and Monk.

Career 
Goldberg began his career as a journalist, covering local news and the police beat for the Contra Costa Times (later renamed the East Bay Times) and UPI, and writing feature articles, interviews and reviews for various national publications, including the San Francisco Chronicle, Los Angeles Times, Newsweek and American Film among others.

He attended UCLA, where he was a reporter and feature writer for the Daily Bruin student newspaper, in addition to his aforementioned journalism work. There he befriended Lewis Perdue, the paper's journalism advisor from 1979 to 1982, who got Goldberg his first writing assignment for Pinnacle Books. The novel, .357 Vigilante, was published under the pseudonym "Ian Ludlow" in 1985. The novel spawned three more sequels and the series' movie rights were optioned by New World Pictures. Although the movie was never made, his script for the movie, co-written with fellow UCLA classmate William Rabkin, led to a long career in television and film. Their first television credit was on the "If You Knew Sammy" episode of Spenser: For Hire about an author of vigilante novels.

Film and Television 
His subsequent writing and producing credits include Murphy's Law, SeaQuest DSV, The Cosby Mysteries, and Monk, among others. He is perhaps best known for his stint as supervising producer and executive producer of the long-running series Diagnosis Murder starring Dick Van Dyke as a doctor who solves crimes.

In 2007, Goldberg wrote and produced the pilot for a German television program, Fast Track: No Limits. which aired on television in some countries and was released a theatrical film in others.

In 2010, he wrote and directed the short film Remaindered, based on his short story for Ellery Queen's Mystery Magazine, on location in Kentucky. He wrote and directed the sequel, Bumsicle, in 2012.

In 2019, he co-wrote and co-created with Robin Bernheim the Hallmark Movies & Mysteries telefilm series Mystery 101 starring Jill Wagner and Kristofer Polaha.

In April 2021, Constantin Films announced that they will be producing a feature film version his novel The Walk based on his screenplay adaptation. 

In March 2022, production began on Fast Charlie, a feature film adaptation Goldberg wrote based on the novel Gun Monkeys by Victor Gischler, directed by Phillip Noyce and starring Pierce Brosnan.

Writing 
In conjunction with his work on Monk and Diagnosis Murder, Goldberg wrote several original tie-in novels based on those series. He has also penned several original crime novels, two featuring ex-cop-turned-Hollywood troubleshooter Charlie Willis and the aforementioned .357 Vigilante series, which he wrote under the pseudonym Ian Ludlow, while still a student.

His novel, The Man with the Iron-On Badge (titled Watch Me Die for its re-release), was nominated for a Shamus Award by the Private Eye Writers of America and was produced in 2007 as the stage play, Mapes For Hire, in Owensboro, Kentucky at the International Mystery Writers Festival.

Goldberg has also written non-fiction books about the entertainment industry, including Unsold Television Pilots and Successful Television Writing. His book, Unsold Television Pilots, was turned into two TV specials – The Greatest Shows You Never Saw on CBS and The Best TV Shows That Never Were on ABC, both written and produced by William Rabkin and Goldberg. They also co-created The Dead Man an original, monthly series of horror novels that rolled-out in October 2011  as the premiere titles of Amazon's new 47North sci-fi/horror/fantasy imprint. Amazon initially ordered 12 books and, in February 2012, extended the series by 12 more. The 24th title, the Kindle Serial Reborn, was published in January 2014 and is the final book in the series to date.

In June 2013, his novel The Heist, the first in a five-book series written with Janet Evanovich, was released by Random House. A prequel short story, "Pros and Cons," was published in May 2013 and became the #1 bestselling Kindle Single for seven straight weeks...and hit both the New York Times and USA Today bestseller lists. The Heist debuted at #2 on the USA Today bestseller list and #5 on the New York Times bestseller list. The sequel, The Chase, debuted at #1 on the Publishers Weekly bestseller list  and #2 on the New York Times bestseller list   in March 2014. The fifth book in the series, The Pursuit, was published in June 2016 and hit #1 on the New York Times bestseller list.

His novel True Fiction, published by Amazon/Thomas & Mercer in April 2018. It was followed by Killer Thriller in February 2019 and Fake Truth in April 2020. All three books are "Ian Ludlow" thrillers, the novelist hero sharing the same name as the pseudonym that Goldberg used to write his .357 Vigilante paperbacks when he was in college in the 1980s.

His series about Detective Eve Ronin, the youngest homicide detective on the Los Angeles County Sheriff's Department history, kicked off with Lost Hills in January 2020 and was followed by Bone Canyon (January 2021)   Gated Prey  (Oct 2021) and Movieland  (June 2022).
. Dream Town, the fifth Ronin novel, will be out in January 2024. A new standalone thriller Malibu Burning will be released in September 2023, followed by another standalone thriller Calico in November 2023.

Publishing 
In September 2014, Goldberg launched the publishing company Brash Books with novelist Joel Goldman. The company publishes new crime fiction as well as award-winning, highly acclaimed crime, thriller and suspense novels that have fallen out of print.

In 2018, Goldberg acquired the copyright to the published and unpublished books by the late author Ralph Dennis, who is best known for his Hardman series of crime novels, which were a major influence on the work of novelist Joe R. Lansdale and screenwriter Shane Black. The Hardman series, with introductions by Joe R. Lansdale, Ben Jones and Robert J. Randisi, among others, as well as Dennis' thriller The War Heist (Goldberg's edited down and revised version of Dennis' 1976 novel MacTaggart's War ) were released by Brash Books in 2019. In February 2020, Brash Books released "All Kinds of Ugly," a long-lost, final Hardman novel, which Goldberg discovered and revised 

In December 2020, he launched another publishing imprint, Cutting Edge Books, to release vintage crime novels, thrillers, westerns, and literary fiction from the 40s, 50s, and early 60s that had fallen out-of-print, including the work of authors Robert Dietrich (E. Howard Hunt), James Howard, March Hastings (Sally Singer), Stuart James, Bud Clifton (David Derek Stacton), and Richard Himmel.

Awards 
Goldberg has been nominated twice for an Edgar Award by the Mystery Writers of America and twice for a Shamus Award by the Private Eye Writers of America. He was the 2012 recipient of the Poirot Award from Malice Domestic.

He has served as a board member for the Mystery Writers of America and also founded, alongside novelist Max Allan Collins, the International Association of Media Tie-in Writers.

In July 2021, he was selected by the City of Agoura, California as their 2021 One City One Book honoree.

Personal life
Goldberg has three younger siblings – Tod Goldberg, Linda Woods and Karen Dinino—all of whom are writers. His uncle is true crime author Burl Barer. Goldberg is of Jewish background.

He lives with his wife and daughter in Calabasas.

Bibliography

Eve Ronin
 Lost Hills (January 2020)
 Bone Canyon (January 2021)
 Gated Prey (October 2021)
 Movieland (June 2022)
 Dream Town (January 2024)

The Ian Ludlow Thrillers
 True Fiction (April 2018)
 Killer Thriller (February 2019)
 Fake Truth (April 2020)

Fox & O'Hare
"Pros and Cons" Short Story prequel (written with Janet Evanovich) (2013)
The Heist (written with Janet Evanovich) (June 2013)
The Chase (written with Janet Evanovich) (Feb 25, 2014)
"The Shell Game" Short Story prequel (written with Janet Evanovich) (2014)
The Job (written with Janet Evanovich) (Nov. 2014)
The Caper Short Story prequel (written with Janet Evanovich)
The Scam (written with Janet Evanovich) (Sept 15, 2015)
The Pursuit (written with Janet Evanovich) (June 21, 2016)

Diagnosis Murder Book Series
 #1 The Silent Partner (2003)
 #2 The Death Merchant (2004)
 #3 The Shooting Script (2004)
 #4 The Waking Nightmare (2005)
 #5 The Past Tense (2005)
 #6 The Dead Letter (2006)
 #7 The Double Life (2006)
 #8 The Last Word (2007)

Monk Book Series
Mr. Monk Goes to the Firehouse (2006)
Mr. Monk Goes to Hawaii (2006)
Mr. Monk and the Blue Flu (2007)
Mr. Monk and the Two Assistants (2007)
Mr. Monk in Outer Space (2007)
Mr. Monk Goes to Germany (2008)
Mr. Monk is Miserable (2008)
Mr. Monk and the Dirty Cop (2009)
Mr. Monk in Trouble (2009) Excerpt: The Case of the Piss-Poor Gold, Ellery Queen Mystery Magazine, November 2009
Mr. Monk is Cleaned Out (2010)
Mr. Monk on the Road (2011) Excerpt: Mr. Monk and the Seventeen Steps, Ellery Queen Mystery Magazine, December 2010
Mr. Monk on the Couch (2011) Excerpt: Mr. Monk and the Sunday Paper, Ellery Queen Mystery Magazine, July 2011
Mr. Monk on Patrol (2012) Excerpt: Mr. Monk and the Open House Ellery Queen Mystery Magazine December 2011
Mr. Monk is a Mess (July 2012) Excerpt: Mr. Monk and the Talking Car Ellery Queen Mystery Magazine May 2012
Mr. Monk Gets Even (January 2013) Excerpt "Mr. Monk Sees the Light" Ellery Queen Mystery Magazine, December 2012

Charlie Willis
My Gun Has Bullets (1995) Reprinted (2003) Kindle Edition (2009)
Beyond the Beyond (1997) Kindle edition (2009) (retitled Dead Space)

The Dead Man Series
Face of Evil (with William Rabkin) (2011)
Ring of Knives (with William Rabkin and James Daniels) (2011)
Hell in Heaven (with William Rabkin) (2011)
The Dead Woman (with William Rabkin and David McAfee) (2011)
The Blood Mesa (with William Rabkin and James Reasoner) (2011)
Kill Them All (with William Rabkin and Harry Shannon) (2011)
Beast Within (with William Rabkin and James Daniels) (2011)
Fire & Ice (with William Rabkin and Jude Hardin) (2012)
Carnival of Death (with William Rabkin and Bill Crider) (2012)
Freaks Must Die (with William Rabkin and Joel Goldman) (2012)
Slaves to Evil (with William Rabkin and Lisa Klink) (2012)
The Midnight Special  (with William Rabkin and Phoef Sutton) (2012)
The Death Match (with William Rabkin and Christa Faust) (2012)
The Black Death (with William Rabkin and Aric Davis) (2012)
The Killing Floor (with William Rabkin and David Tully) (2012)
Colder Than Hell (with William Rabkin and Anthony Neil Smith) (Jan 2013)
Evil to Burn (with William Rabkin and Lisa Klink) (March 2013)
Streets of Blood  (with William Rabkin and Barry Napier) (June 2013)
Crucible of Fire   (with William Rabkin and Mel Odom) (2013)
The Dark Need  (with William Rabkin and Stant Litore) (2013)
The Rising Dead (with William Rabkin and Stella Green) (2014)
Reborn   (with William Rabkin, Kate Danley, Phoef Sutton, and Lisa Klink) (2014)

The Jury Series
.357 Vigilante (1985) Kindle Edition 2010 (retitled Judgment)
.357 Vigilante: Make Them Pay (1985) Kindle Edition 2010 (retitled Adjourned)
.357 Vigilante: White Wash (1985) Kindle Edition 2010 (retitled Payback)
.357 Vigilante: Killstorm  Unpublished, released in a Kindle Edition 2010 (retitled Guilty)

Non-fiction
Unsold TV Pilots (1992)
Unsold Television Pilots 1955–1989 (1990)
Television Series Revivals (1993) retitled "Television Fast Forward" in the 2010 ebook edition
Science Fiction Film-Making in the 1980s (1994) – co-written with William Rabkin, Randy & Jean-Marc Lofficier
The Dreamweavers: Fantasy Film-Making in the 1980s (1994) – co-written with William Rabkin, Randy & Jean-Marc Lofficier
Successful Television Writing (2003) – co-written with William Rabkin
Tied In- The Business, Craft, and History of Media Tie-In Writing (2010) – editor
The James Bond Films 1962-1989 (2022)
The Joy of Sets: Interviews on the sets of 1980s Genre Movies (2022)

Standalones
The Walk (2004) Kindle Edition 2009
The Man with the Iron-On Badge (2005) Kindle Edition 2011 (retitled Watch Me Die)
Top Suspense: 13 Stories by 12 Masters of the Genre (2011) Contributor
Thrillers: 100 Must Reads (2010) contributor 
Die, Lover, Die! (2011) contributor
McGrave (2012)
King City (2012)
Ella Clah: The Pilot Script (with William Rabkin, Aimee Thurlo & David Thurlo) (2013)
Hollywood vs the Author (2018) contributor
The Buy Back Blues (Afterword to novel by Ralph Dennis) (2019)
All Kinds of Ugly (Afterword to novel by Ralph Dennis) (2020)
Tales of a Sad, Fat Wordman (Introduction to novel by Ralph Dennis) (2020)
Collectibles Edited by Lawrence Block (Contributor, Short story Lost Shows) (2021)
Malibu Burning (Coming September 2023)
Calico (Coming November 2023)

Filmography

References

External links

 Official Website
 Diagnosis Murder Website
 Interview at earthprime.com
 Interview at Storylink
 Quotenmeter review of Fast Track
 
 Interview for Serien Junkies
 Interview Honolulu Star Bulletin
 interview St. Petersburg Times
 Entertainment Weekly on the Monk Books
 Lee Goldberg on "Frak" in the Atlanta Constitution
  Two Authors Launch Brash Books "Publishers Weekly"
 Sibling Revelry: Goldberg Brothers Hit Bestseller List Publishers Weekly
 The Brothers Goldberg: Tod Goldberg interviews Lee Goldberg in the Los Angeles Review of Books
 The Opposite of Jack Reacher: Publishers Weekly Talks to Lee Goldberg

20th-century American novelists
21st-century American novelists
American crime fiction writers
American male novelists
American television writers
American male screenwriters
Television producers from California
Jewish American novelists
Living people
Year of birth missing (living people)
Place of birth missing (living people)
People from Greater Los Angeles
People from Walnut Creek, California
American male television writers
20th-century American male writers
21st-century American male writers
Novelists from California
Screenwriters from California
University of California, Los Angeles alumni
21st-century American Jews